Achan is a 1952 Indian Malayalam-language film, directed by M. R. S. Mani and produced by M. Kunchacko. The film stars Prem Nazir and B. S. Saroja in lead roles. The film had musical score by P. S. Divakar. This was the only film in which veteran actor Sesbastian Kunjukunju Bhagavatahar did a comic role. It is one of the major box office hits of early Malayalam cinema. It will be remembered as the debut of Boban Kunchacko, the maiden venture of XL Productions, and first film of Thiruvananthapuram V. Lakshmi. The film was remade in Tamil as Thanthai, again with Prem Nazir. Kambadasan wrote the dialogues and lyrics. The film was released in April 1953.

Malayalam cast

Female cast
 B. S. Saroja as Usha, an artiste in Nanukkuttan's drama troupe
 Baby Girija
 T. Jaya Shree
 Pankajavalli
 Adoor Pankajam
 C. R. Lakshmi
 Vanakkutty

Male cast
 Sukumaran
 Boban Kunjakko
 C. L. Anandan
 Prem Nazir
 Kunjukunju Bhagavathar as Nanukkuttan, a drama troupe owner
 S. P. Pillai as Mathu, leader of a group of rogues
 Mathappan

Dance
 B. S. Saroja
 C. R. Rajakumari
 Madura Devi
 Ramani Gopal
 Baby Girija

Tamil cast
Cast adapted from the song book

Main Cast
 B. S. Saroja as Usha (Heroine)
 Baby Girija as Young Usha
 Jaya Shree as Aunt
 Pankajavalli as Lady Musician 
 Adoor Pankajam as Usha's Friend
 Sukumaran as Father
 Boban Kunjakko as Young Chandran & Chandran (1)
 Master Pinay as Chandran (2)
 Prem Nazir as Chandran & (Hero 3)
 Kunjukunju Bhagavathar as Nanukkuttan
 S. P. Pillai as Lady
 Mathappan as Koman

Dance
 B. S. Saroja
 C. R. Rajakumari
 Madura Devi
 Ramani Gopal
 Baby Girija

Soundtrack
P. S. Divakar composed the music for both Malayalam and Tamil versions.
Malayalam songs (Achan)
Lyrics were penned by Abhayadev. Playback singers are A. M. Rajah, Madhavapeddi Satyam, Kozhikode Abdul Kader, P. Leela, Thiruvananthapuram V. Lakshmi & Kaviyoor Revamma.

Tamil songs (Thanthai)
Lyrics were penned by Kambadasan. Playback singers are A. M. Rajah, P. Leela, V. J. Varma, Thiruvananthapuram V. Lakshmi and Kaviyoor Revamma.

Reception 
B. Vijaykumar of The Hindu wrote, "Thikkurissi’s outstanding performance was one of the highpoints of the film."

References

External links
 

1952 films
1950s Malayalam-language films
Malayalam films remade in other languages
Films shot in Thiruvananthapuram